Lindsay Peak is a basalt peak,  high, standing  west-northwest of Blizzard Peak in the Marshall Mountains of Antarctica. It was named by the Ohio State University party to the Queen Alexandra Range (1966–67) for John Lindsay, a geologist with the party.

References

External links

Mountains of the Ross Dependency
Shackleton Coast